Richard Santiago Rodríguez (born September 28, 1970) is a retired male boxer from Puerto Rico, who won the bronze medal in the men's middleweight (– 75 kg) category at the 1991 Pan American Games in Havana, Cuba. He represented his native country at the 1992 Summer Olympics in Barcelona, Spain, falling in the first round to Germany's Sven Ottke.

References
Profile

1970 births
Living people
Middleweight boxers
Boxers at the 1991 Pan American Games
Boxers at the 1992 Summer Olympics
Olympic boxers of Puerto Rico
Puerto Rican male boxers
Pan American Games bronze medalists for Puerto Rico
Pan American Games medalists in boxing
Medalists at the 1991 Pan American Games